Lina Kačiušytė (born 1 January 1963 in Vilnius, Lithuanian SSR) is a Lithuanian swimmer who competed for the Soviet Union, winner of a gold medal in 200 m breaststroke with the Olympic record time of 2:29:54 at the 1980 Summer Olympics.

Biography
She trained at the VSS Žalgiris in Vilnius. Her first coach from 1974 to 1977, Arvydas Gražiūnas, saw her great potential and guided her in the right direction.  By 1976 she was invited to train with the USSR's youth swimming team and, within a year promoted to the USSR National Team.  Following another year of hard training, she was ready for the 1978 World Championships of Berlin.

She surprised everyone by winning the 200 m breaststroke and setting two world records: one in the prelims, defeating world record holder and teammate Yuliya Bogdanova, the second when winning the gold medal in the finals.  She set the world record a third time the following year at the USSR vs. DDR Dual Meet in Potsdam, a record that stood from 1979 through 1985 when it was finally broken by East Germany's Silke Hörner. Kačiušytė was the first female breaststroke swimmer to go under the 2 minute 30 second barrier for the 200 meter event.

In 1998 she was inducted into the International Swimming Hall of Fame.

See also
 List of members of the International Swimming Hall of Fame

References

External links
 YouTube heat 200 m breaststroke Olympic Games -80
 YouTube heat 100 m breaststroke Olympic Games -80
 
 
 

1963 births
Lithuanian female breaststroke swimmers
Living people
Olympic swimmers of the Soviet Union
Olympic gold medalists for the Soviet Union
Soviet female breaststroke swimmers
Swimmers at the 1980 Summer Olympics
World Aquatics Championships medalists in swimming
Lithuanian Sportsperson of the Year winners
Sportspeople from Vilnius
Medalists at the 1980 Summer Olympics
Olympic gold medalists in swimming
Universiade medalists in swimming
Universiade gold medalists for the Soviet Union
Universiade bronze medalists for the Soviet Union
Medalists at the 1981 Summer Universiade